Pseudomonas fulva is a Gram-negative environmental bacterium, originally isolated from rice and commonly associated with rice plants, grains and paddy fields. It is rod-shaped and motile using one to three polar flagella.

Based on 16S rRNA analysis, P. fulva has been placed in the P. putida group.

P. fulva is symbiotic in the gut of Hypothenemus hampei, the primary pest of coffee seeds. It has been shown to thrive by digesting caffeine to obtain nitrogen, while enabling the host insect to live on green coffee berries without harm.  P. fulva was one of 14 bacteria found in the digestive tract of the insects to thrive in a medium high in caffeine.  The bacteria were screened for the gene ndmA that is known to transform caffeine; only P. fulva possessed this gene. The other bacteria are thought to help break down the caffeine using different genes.

References

External links
Type strain of Pseudomonas fulva at BacDive -  the Bacterial Diversity Metadatabase

Pseudomonadales
Bacteria described in 1963